Wolfgang von Schwind also spelled Wolfgang von Schwindt (4 July 1879 – 19 April 1949) was an Austrian actor and opera singer. He appeared in more than eighty films from 1920 to 1947. He was the grandson of Austrian painter Moritz von Schwind.

Selected filmography

References

External links 

1879 births
1949 deaths
Austrian male film actors
Austrian male silent film actors
20th-century Austrian male actors
Austrian male stage actors
20th-century Austrian male opera singers
German Bohemian people
Austrian people of German Bohemian descent
People from Loket